Dams and reservoirs in Kyrgyzstan are used for irrigation, water supply, hydro-electric power generation or combination of these. The country's largest reservoirs are listed below.

Citations:

References

Kyrgyzstan
Economy of Kyrgyzstan

Dams